Kalle Jellvert (born August 5, 1995) is a Swedish professional ice hockey player. He is currently playing with Modo Hockey of the HockeyAllsvenskan (Allsv).

Jellvert made his Swedish Hockey League debut playing with Örebro HK during the 2014–15 SHL season.

References

External links

1995 births
Living people
AIK IF players
Modo Hockey players
Swedish ice hockey centres
HC Vita Hästen players
Örebro HK players
Sportspeople from Örebro